John Gorman (born 4 January 1936), is an English comedian, vocalist and comedy musician.

The Scaffold
After grammar school, Gorman worked as a Telecommunications Engineer. He was the founder of the comedy music group The Scaffold, best known for their 1968 hit single Lily the Pink, and its successor the band Grimms – the 'G' in Gorman providing the 'G' in Grimms.  He also made a comedy musical album for DJM Records, Go Man Gorman.

During the 1970s he made brief film appearances in Frankie Howerd's medieval set farce Up the Chastity Belt (1971), Melody (1971), Terry Gilliam's Jabberwocky (1977), where he is credited as 'second peasant', and The Music Machine (1979) as a newsagent.

Television
He also made appearances on the British children's television show Tiswas between 1977 and 1981, (became a regular member in 1978) and was one of the Four Bucketeers, a novelty band whose highest-charting single was "Bucket of Water Song", which reached No. 26 in the UK Singles Chart in 1980.  After Tiswas, he worked with Chris Tarrant on its adult-orientated successor O.T.T.. He then moved to Tyne Tees, first on the children's game show How Dare You! and later on another children's show, Razzmatazz.

After a period living in France, he returned as Artistic Director for the Theatre on the Steps in Bridgnorth, Shropshire, England.  He appeared on the Tiswas Reunited show on ITV1 on 16 June 2007. Also in 2007 he announced plans to establish a Wirral Academy of the Arts at Birkenhead Park.

On 16 April 2022, Gorman reunited once again with Bob Carolgees, Sally James and Chris Tarrant for a Tiswas reunion show at  St George's in Bristol as part of the city's annual Slapstick Festival.

See also
Liverpool poets

References

1936 births
Living people
English male singers
British parodists
Parody musicians
English comedy musicians
English male comedians
English television presenters
People from Birkenhead
Entertainers from Merseyside
The Scaffold members
Grimms members